Joseph Lowthian Hudson (October 17, 1846 – July 5, 1912), a.k.a. J. L. Hudson, was the merchant who founded the Hudson's department store in Detroit, Michigan. Hudson also supplied the seed capital for the establishment, in 1909, of Roy D. Chapin's automotive venture, which Chapin named the Hudson Motor Car Company in honor of J.L. Hudson.

Biography
Hudson was born in Newcastle upon Tyne, England, and immigrated with his family to Hamilton, Ontario, Canada, when he was nine; by the age of fourteen he and members of his family were residing in Michigan. His brother William moved to Buffalo, New York, in 1896, to operate a branch of the Hudson's store until his death in 1928.

While Hudson began his career in merchandising with family members and other outside partners, he founded what would provide the basis for Hudson's Department Stores in 1881 inside a shop at the Detroit Opera House. Hudson at first focused on men's and boy's wear. The retail operation succeeded by setting low prices and a return policy that favored the customer. As business volume grew, Hudson added sales professionals and additional lines of goods, including women's clothing and housewares. Hudson incorporated his venture in 1891 as the J.L. Hudson Company.

In addition to providing the seed capital for Hudson Motor Car Company, J.L. Hudson was also involved the American Vapor Stove Company, Dime Savings Bank of Detroit, American Exchange National Bank, the Detroit City Gas Company, and the Third National Bank of Detroit. When the Third National Bank collapsed in the financial panic of 1893, Hudson felt personally liable for the failure and paid from his personal accounts an amount equal to the balances of record held by each account holder. The move cost Hudson $265,000, however, the goodwill that it showed also paid Hudson dividends in the form of increasing market share for his businesses. Hudson was also active in civic causes in the greater Detroit area.

Joseph never married, but toward the end of his life, he was engaged to Eida Caroline Schmidt, though he died from a lung problem while on a business trip on July 5, 1912, before they could marry. Some sources list his place of death as Worthing, England, while some newspaper accounts list the place of death as Paris. From New York, Hudson's casket was carried to Detroit by train accompanied by members of his family. Services were held July 19, 1912, at Central Methodist Church before interrment at Woodlawn Cemetery.

According to biographer Edward L. Lack Jr., Hudson left no personal papers, and the details outside of his public life are few and mostly unknown.

Hudson's niece Eleanor Lowthian Clay (1896–1976) was the wife of Edsel Ford.

References

Further reading
 
 Betz, Paul; and Carnes, Mark C., editors. American National Biography. (First supplement). New York: Oxford University Press, 2002.
Lach, Edward L. Jr. "Hudson, J. L."; American National Biography Online, January 2001 Update.

External links
How J.L. Hudson changed the way we shop
 Hudson's hundredth 1881-1981 (booklet)

1846 births
1912 deaths
American businesspeople in retailing
English emigrants to the United States
Businesspeople from Detroit
Businesspeople from Newcastle upon Tyne
People in the automobile industry
Hudson Motor Car Company
American company founders
Burials at Woodlawn Cemetery (Detroit)
19th-century American businesspeople